Ninaki Mountain is located in Montana,  southwest of Carway, Alberta and  southwest of Chief Mountain. It was named in honour of the sacrifice of the wife who threw her baby, then herself off the mountain in reaction to the death of her war-chief husband as a result of a battle which took place between Peigan and Blackfeet warriors.

References

External links

 Ninaki photo: Flickr

Mountains of Glacier County, Montana
Mountains of Glacier National Park (U.S.)
Mountains of Montana